Hood Arrest is the eighth studio album by American rapper MC Eiht, released June 2, 2003 on Lookin Up Entertainment. It features a bonus DVD.

Track listing
"Intro -- 0:29"
"Bring Back the Funk -- 4:12"
"Dead Money -- 4:29"
"I'm a G -- 4:35"
"New Shit True Shit -- 4:18"
"Hustle 4 Doe -- 3:55"
"Nothing to Loose -- 4:21"
"Struggle -- 4:13"
"Welcome Back to the Ghetto -- 4:19" (featuring Spice 1)
"Make Some Dough -- 4:15"
"It's Your Life -- 4:24"
"We Gots to Work -- 3:40"

MC Eiht albums
2003 albums